The 1950 Chatham Cup was the 23rd annual nationwide knockout football competition in New Zealand.

The competition was run on a regional basis, with regional associations each holding separate qualifying rounds. Teams taking part in the final rounds are known to have included Eden (Auckland), Claudelands Rovers (Hamilton), Moturoa AFC (New Plymouth), Wanganui Old Boys, Ohakea, Brooklyn United (Wellington), Technical Old Boys (Christchurch), and Northern (Dunedin).

The 1950 final
Eden took the cup back to Auckland for the first time in 16 years. In the final, played in front of a crowd of 11,000, the first half contained one goal for each side. Tech's Cyril Thomas was the first on the scoresheet, but Eden levelled when Peter Goddard's shot was deflected off a Tech defender. In the second spell, John Jakens put Eden into the lead after concerted pressure in the first few minutes, but Technical came back strongly and equalised via Vic Smith (some reports credit the goal to Colin Bailey). The southern side had a chance to regain the lead in the first period of extra time from the spot, but the penalty miss proved costly and Eden took advantage, finding the winner when Don Brewer deflected a Goddard cross into the Tech goalmouth.

Results

Final

References

Rec.Sport.Soccer Statistics Foundation New Zealand 1950 page

Chatham Cup
Chatham Cup
1950 domestic association football cups
September 1950 sports events in New Zealand